Kakizaki may refer to:

Kakizaki (surname), a Japanese surname
Kakizaki, Niigata, a former town in Nakakubiki District, Niigata Prefecture, Japan
Kakizaki Station, a railway station in Jōetsu, Niigata Prefecture, Japan